Slashed is a low budget independent horror film, financed and directed by Ash and written by Jed Shepherd. The film was shot in 2002, purely on a video camcorder when Ash were on tour in the United States supporting Coldplay - who subsequently appeared in the movie as detectives, along with various other musicians who the band ran into on their tour, including Dave Grohl, Moby and Neil Hannon.

The film was never completed, and therefore never released in its intended full entirety, with short clips and pictures surfacing onto the Internet sporadically, until February 27, 2010 it was announced on Ash's website that work had begun on putting the footage to use, and on May 24, 2010 the first - a music video for A-Z Series single "Binary" was released onto YouTube, a second video is soon to follow.

Cast

Chris Martin as FBI Agent Sherbet Bones
Jonny Buckland as FBI Agent Datsun Ford
Dave Grohl as Hysterical Dave Grohl
Moby as himself
Tim Wheeler as himself
Mark Hamilton as himself
Rick McMurray as himself
Charlotte Hatherley as herself
Neil Hannon as himself
Tav as himself
Matt Sharp as God
James Nesbitt as himself
Chris Carrabba as himself
Ben Kweller as himself
Christi Shingara as girl walking with Ben Kweller #1
Lindsey Shingara as girl walking with Ben Kweller #2
Amy Lordan as Angel #1
Katie Hutchinson as Angel #2
The movie features a predominantly musician based cast, with cameos from members of The Hives and The Vines.

Release
The narrative is presented as a tour diary for the Northern Irish rock band Ash, but soon reveals itself to be a gorefest. The film features many famous musicians and actors, some playing themselves while others playing specially written characters. The initial idea was given to Shepherd to write a short 'slasher' film for use on the DVD side of the 2002 single release 'Envy'. The film was anticipated by the tabloid and music press but had never officially been released.

Due to be released in 2004, to much press hype, Slashed did not appear for reasons unknown. In July 2007, Ash bassist Mark Hamilton let it be known that it was to be uploaded to YouTube as "I'm sure some people would want to see Chris Martin getting murdered". Initially thought to have been a hoax, a few clips have surfaced over the years to quell the disbelievers. Photos of the filming have also been on Ash and Coldplay websites for years and the long gestation period has not quenched the fans desires to see their favourite artists covered in blood and guts.

On May 24, 2010, the first of two Slashed based music videos were released onto the Internet. This six-minute teaser includes scenes featuring Ash, Coldplay, Matt Sharp, Ben Kweller and Charlotte Hatherley.

On June 17, 2012 at the 20th Birthday gig for Ash named #ASH20, promoted by Piper/Shepherd, various unseen scenes were shown to people who bought VIP tickets. Approx 100 people watched mostly Coldplay based scenes, in between narration by Ash's Mark Hamilton and writer Jed Shepherd. There have been internet rumours that based on this screening, there may be an official release at a later date.

Cinematic and literary allusions

In the film, the supernatural killer is Martha, a young woman murdered on her honeymoon. She comes back from the grave to exact revenge upon a world who destroyed her perfect life. This emulates the narrative of many Japanese Horror which were a big influence on the writer and director. They were also influenced by the films of Troma and many of the sequences employ graphic scenes of gore, nudity and buckets of blood in line with this ethic.

References

External links

The rocky horror picture show - Hot Press (subscription needed)
Scary Movie! - NMEX-clusive: Ash Meet Star Wars Creator - Xfm (last 3 paragraphs are about Slashed)
Moby's desert horror - NMESLASHED: Dave Grohl in Horror Film! HACKED TO BITS! video - NME24/7: Ash in tour horror - Sunday Mirror (subscription needed)
HOT MUSIC: Bloody Hell! Ash get video nasty - The People'' (subscription needed)

American slasher films
American independent films
Unreleased American films